Travis William Atkins (December 9, 1975 – June 1, 2007) was a soldier in the United States Army. President Donald Trump awarded him the Medal of Honor posthumously on March 27, 2019. While serving with the 2nd Infantry Brigade Combat Team of the 10th Mountain Division in Iraq, he sacrificed his own life to shield three fellow soldiers from an insurgent who was wearing and activated an explosive vest.

Distinguished Service Cross citation
Atkins was originally awarded the Distinguished Service Cross for his actions. The accompanying citation reads:

Medal of Honor award ceremony and citation

His son Trevor accepted the award From President Donald Trump, along with his sister Jennifer, his mom, and grandparents. Also in attendance were the Vice-president, the Chairman of the Joint Chiefs, and the Secretary of the Army, as well as five previous living recipients of the award, and numerous distinguished members of the military. Witnesses to the award also included the three men whose lives Atkins saved in his selfless act.

The president said of Atkins, “He did not run. He didn't know what it was to run. He acted in the tradition of the 10th Mountain Division in his 'climb to glory.'”

Awards and decorations

Legacy
In June 2012, the ceremony room at the Military Entrance Processing Station in Butte, Montana was named in honor of Atkins. In January 2013, the Mountain Functional Fitness Facility at Fort Drum in the state of New York was renamed in his honor.

See also
 List of post-Vietnam War Medal of Honor recipients

References

External links

Medal of Honor: Staff Sergeant Travis Atkins

1975 births
2007 deaths
People from Great Falls, Montana
American military personnel killed in the Iraq War
United States Army Medal of Honor recipients
Military personnel from Montana
Iraq War recipients of the Medal of Honor
United States Army personnel of the Iraq War
United States Army non-commissioned officers